Clavus nodulosa is a species of sea snail, a marine gastropod mollusk in the family Drilliidae.

Description
The shell grows to a length of 11 mm; its diameter is 4.5 mm.

(Original description) The shell is pyramidally oblong. It contains eight whorls. These are concavely depressed above and contain about ten longitudinally nodose ribs. The body whorl is encircled by a row of tuberculous nodules, in continuation of the longitudinal ribs. The aperture is oval. The sinus is round and deep. The short siphonal canal is wide. The color of the shell is reddish brown. The ribs and the base of the columella are whitish.

Distribution
This species occurs in the demersal zone of the tropical Pacific Ocean and in the Indian Ocean along Réunion.

References

 Tucker, J.K. 2004 Catalog of recent and fossil turrids (Mollusca: Gastropoda). Zootaxa 682:1–1295

External links
 

nodulosa
Gastropods described in 1863